The list of ship launches in 1853 includes a chronological list of some ships launched in 1853.


References

Sources

1853
Ship launches